Bombay Beach is a census-designated place (CDP) in Imperial County, California, United States. The population was 231 at the 2020 census, down from 295 in 2010, down from 366 in 2000. It is part of the El Centro, California, metropolitan statistical area.

Bombay Beach was once a popular getaway for beachgoers until the 1980s, when the draining and increasing salinity of the Salton Sea destroyed the lake's ecosystem and drove businesses and private landowners out of the area, rendering Bombay Beach a ghost town. Despite this, by 2018, a number of people had moved into the area, and the town's many abandoned structures and features from its past have drawn visitors back in. An article in The Guardian stated that it was "enjoying a rebirth of sorts with an influx of artists, intellectuals and hipsters who have turned it into a bohemian playground." The Bombay Beach Biennale, an annual art festival, is held here.

History
During the 1950s, Bombay Beach was a popular beachgoing destination. Celebrities such as Frank Sinatra, the Beach Boys, and Bing Crosby frequented the luxury resorts along the Salton Sea, which was known for its fishing, boating and water skiing. The area attracted half a million tourists annually, rivaling Yosemite National Park.

Bombay Beach's decline began around the 1970s, when the runoff (full of salty chemicals) led to a warning that the salinity of the lake would no longer sustain wildlife; that occurred by the early 1980s. Many residents around the Salton Sea, including those in Bombay Beach, were eventually driven to move out by the odor of the dying fish, the fear of health problems, and both the flooding and the draining of the Salton Sea. Many of the remaining residents are reportedly either too poor to move out or too attached to the history of the area to leave. A report by the Pacific Institute in September 2019 stated that ten years earlier, "there were some 100 million fish in the Sea. Now, more than 97 percent of those fish are gone."

There are only two stores in the town, one of which is a convenience store, and the closest hospital is over 45 minutes away in Brawley. The Ski Inn bar and restaurant is the only eating and drinking establishment in the town. The "Bombay Beach Drive-In" is an art installation consisting of old, abandoned cars at a drive-in theater. A visitor in 2019 wrote that there were many "discarded homes and trailers long-since abandoned" and that many of the buildings were "windowless husks blanketed in graffiti, surrounded by broken furniture and rubble."

The derelict "living ghost town" status of Bombay Beach has attracted many photographers, filmmakers, urban explorers, and tourists, to the point that locals tend to ask visitors if they are filmmakers that are there to shoot a documentary. The town, as well as others on the shores of the Salton Sea, is one of the lowest settlements in elevation in North America. The local American Legion, Post 801, had 36 members in 2016 and closed down "for a few years" before reopening as a volunteer-run facility.

In 2018, as people began to move back into Bombay Beach, house prices had risen; some bungalows were selling for "tens of thousands of dollars." The community has held the Bombay Beach Biennale each spring since 2016, inviting "artists, academics, writers, and film-makers to create work, give lectures, and stage happenings". The 2020 Biennale was postponed due to the COVID-19 pandemic.

The population of Bombay Beach has been described as "mostly elderly residents" who "live in a grid of mobile homes and eccentric (and, sometimes, elaborate) small homes and shacks."

Geography

Bombay Beach is located in Southern California's Sonoran Desert. Bombay Beach is located on the east shore of the Salton Sea and, like many communities along its shores, has had to contend with fluctuating water levels, reducing size of the lake and increasing salinity. A berm was built in the 1970s to protect the west end of the town, but a portion of the town beyond the berm was either submerged or half-buried in mud.

Bombay Beach marks the southern end of the San Andreas Fault, where the southern terminus of the San Andreas transitions into the Brawley Seismic Zone.

Art

Bombay Beach features a large number of art pieces and installations around the town and along the beach.

Demographics

2010

At the 2010 census Bombay Beach had a population of 295. The racial makeup of Bombay Beach was 223 (76%) White, 37 (13%) African American, 8 (3%) Native American, 1 (0%) Asian, 0 (0%) Pacific Islander, 22 (8%) from other races, and 4 (1%) from two or more races. Hispanic or Latino of any race were 59 people (20%).

The entirety of the population lived in households, no one lived in non-institutionalized group quarters and no one was institutionalized.

There were 175 households, 19 (11%) had children under the age of 18 living in them, 51 (29%) were married couples living together, 13 (7%) had a female householder with no husband present, 4 (2%) had a male householder with no wife present.  There were 7 (4%) unmarried partnerships, and 1 (1%) same-sex married couples or partnerships. 97 households (55%) were one person and 51 (29%) had someone living alone who was 65 or older. The average household size was 1.69. There were 68 families (39% of households); the average family size was 2.54.

The age distribution was 30 people (10%) under the age of 18, 16 people (5%) aged 18 to 24, 36 people (12%) aged 25 to 44, 98 people (33%) aged 45 to 64, and 115 people (39%) who were 65 or older. The median age was 58.5 years. For every 100 females, there were 113.8 males. For every 100 females age 18 and over, there were 108.6 males.

The homeowner vacancy rate was 15%; the rental vacancy rate was 16%. 198 people (67% of the population) lived in owner-occupied housing units and 97 people (33%) lived in rental housing units.

2000
At the 2000 census there were 366 people, 178 households, and 93 families in the CDP. The racial makeup of the CDP was 71% White, 19% Black or African American, 1% Native American, 0% Asian, 4% from other races, and 5% from two or more races.  19% of the population were Hispanic or Latino of any race.
Of the 178 households 18% had children under the age of 18 living with them, 39% were married couples living together, 11% had a female householder with no husband present, and 47% were non-families. 40% of households were one person and 26% were one person aged 65 or older.  The average household size was 2 and the average family size was 2.8.

The age distribution was 18% under the age of 18, 3% from 18 to 24, 20% from 25 to 44, 26% from 45 to 64, and 33% 65 or older.  The median age was 53 years. For every 100 females, there were 92.6 males.  For every 100 females age 18 and over, there were 99.3 males.

The median household income was $17,708 and the median family income  was $19,511. Males had a median income of $31,250 versus $14,213 for females. The per capita income for the CDP was $10,535.  About 12% of families and 28% of the population were below the poverty line, including 40% of those under age 18 and 14% of those age 65 or over.

Government

Fire protection and emergency medical services in Bombay Beach are provided by the Imperial County Fire Department and the Bombay Beach Volunteer Fire Department, the latter of which consists of one member.

Law enforcement in Bombay Beach is provided by the Imperial County Sheriff's Office North County Patrol Division.

Water service is provided by the Coachella Valley Water District.

In media

Music
Florian-Ayala Fauna of the music duo "uncertain" grew up in Bombay Beach. Fauna credits the place as an inspiration to her music. According to Paris-based art community Artchipel, Fauna said the place had a "big impact on her childhood and became a major influence in her life." In an interview with Buffalo, New York alternative newspaper The Publics Cory Perla, she described it as "a very kind of post-apocalyptic-looking town."

Bombay Beach is the subject of the 2019 single "Bombay Beach" by the Minneapolis blues rock band The Dead Century.

Queer Singer Brandon and The Clubs used Bombay Beach in one of his lyrics in the song "Crazy Beautiful Life" on his sophomore album "Sparkle". The lyric goes: "...with my boyfriend, on a beach in Bombay".

Sports
American football safety Cedric Thompson for the Minnesota Vikings of the National Football League (NFL) also grew up in Bombay Beach, California. He became one of the primary subjects of the 2011 documentary Bombay Beach directed by Alma Har'el. He later cited boredom in Bombay Beach as his inspiration for pro football.

Filming
Bombay Beach is a documentary film about some residents of the community, made by Israeli-born filmmaker Alma Har’el, and described by The New York Times as a "surreal documentary". The film won first prize in the documentary section of the Tribeca Film Festival in 2011.

A 2013 promotional video for the fifth season of Animal Planet's River Monsters was filmed at Bombay Beach.

Austrian singer Christina Stürmer used Bombay Beach as one of the settings for her video of the song Millionen Lichter (A Million Lights).

In the CBS police procedural series The Mentalist, the first episode of the sixth season "The Desert Rose" was filmed in Bombay Beach, California. The production team created a sign for the fictional "Borrego Gas Diner" to stand-in for the local bar and restaurant Ski Inn.

In 2015, the film Sky opens with an unhappily married French couple on vacation in the deserts of Southern California. While visiting Bombay Beach, they mention its potential for a very large earthquake.

Video games 
The town of Sandy Shores in the 2013 video game Grand Theft Auto V is partially based on Bombay Beach.

See also
 Southern Border Region

References

External links

 Bombay Beach in 2013 on Super Paranormal
 Polar Inertia's history of Bombay Beach
 
 The 2006 documentary film Plagues and Pleasures on the Salton Sea (narrated by John Waters) documented the lives of the inhabitants of Bombay Beach, Niland, and Salton City, as well as the ecological issues associated with the Sea.

Census-designated places in Imperial County, California
Salton Sea
El Centro metropolitan area
Populated places in the Colorado Desert
Census-designated places in California